KIAA1755 is a protein that in humans is encoded by the KIAA1755 gene.

References

Further reading